Jijilia Waqabaca Luveni “Titi” Dugucanavanua (born 30 June 1988) is a Fijian footballer who plays as a defender for Suva FC. She has been a member of the Fiji women's national team.

Club career
Dugucanavanua has played for Suva in Fiji.

International career
Dugucanavanua capped for Fiji at senior level during the 2010 OFC Women's Championship.

References

1988 births
Living people
Fijian women's footballers
Women's association football defenders
Fiji women's international footballers